Tharp House is a historic home located near Farmington, Kent County, Delaware; it was the home of Delaware Governor William Tharp (1803–1865). It is a -story, four-bay frame structure, with a three-bay brick rear portion. It also has a rear wing, which is thought to have been a kitchen outbuilding joined to the main body of the house.

It was listed on the National Register of Historic Places in 1973.

References

Houses on the National Register of Historic Places in Delaware
Houses completed in 1847
Houses in Kent County, Delaware
1847 establishments in Delaware
National Register of Historic Places in Kent County, Delaware
U.S. Route 13